Boris Petrov Komitov (b. April 5, 1954, Stara Zagora, Bulgaria) is a Bulgarian astronomer and geophysicist. He is an active researcher in the fields of physics of planetary and comet atmospheres, solar physics and solar-climate relationships. He has authored more than 70 peer-reviewed science articles, 50 popular-science articles as well as 3 books concerning the physics of the Solar System, the Sun and the Solar-Earth Connections. In 2008 the Minor Planet Centre at the International Astronomical Union named an asteroid from the main asteroid belt (between Mars and Jupiter) after him in recognition of his scientific contributions and educational work (20363 Komitov 1998KU1).

References

External links
 
 
 
 
 

Bulgarian astronomers
Bulgarian physicists
Sofia University alumni
1954 births
Living people
People from Stara Zagora
Planetary scientists